Abdolreza Barzegari (born 3 July 1958 in Abadan, Iran) is a former Iranian football player.

Playing career
Barzagari known as "The Persian Black Pearl", he started playing football at a young age in his neighborhood of Ahmad Abad in Abadan. After changing a few teams during his earlier years, he joined Sanat Naft, the most popular team of Khuzestan. He made his debut at 17 against Tractor Sazi in Takhte Jamshid League, but his debut was not too promising and did not go well for the young player.
He was benched for the next game but figured in the team which hosted Persepolis in 1975 touching shoulders with the greats such as Ali Parvin and Parviz Ghelichkhani. After that, Barzagari quickly became a famous player particularity for his excellent dribbling skill. He was selected for the Youth team and he Represented Iran in the Inaugural FIFA youth World Cup in Tunisia. He scored on that tournament. Then came national team and later many years of playing club football abroad in UAE, Qatar and Egypt. He played two seasons for Al-Nasr, then moved to Qatar SC and remained there until he joined Al-Masry in 1992 together with his friend Ebrahim Ghasempour.

International career
He was a member of the Iran national under-20 football team at 1977 FIFA World Youth Championship. He made his debut for Iran national football team in Tehran on 6 September 1978 versus USSR. After that he played for national team in 1980 Olympic Games Qualification and 1980 AFC Asian Cup.

International goals
Scores and results list Iran's goal tally first.

References

1958 births
Living people
Iranian footballers
Iranian football managers
Iranian expatriate footballers
Sanat Naft Abadan F.C. players
1980 AFC Asian Cup players
Iran international footballers
Al-Nasr SC (Dubai) players
Expatriate footballers in the United Arab Emirates
Expatriate footballers in Egypt
Expatriate footballers in Qatar
Al Masry SC players
Qatar SC players
People from Abadan, Iran
Iranian expatriate sportspeople in the United Arab Emirates
Iranian expatriate sportspeople in Egypt
Iranian expatriate sportspeople in Qatar
Association football midfielders
UAE Pro League players
Qatar Stars League players
Iranian people of African descent
Sportspeople from Khuzestan province